Poshtu (also Romanized as Poshtū; also known as Poshtooh and Poshtū’īyeh) is a village in Mosaferabad Rural District, Rudkhaneh District, Rudan County, Hormozgan Province, Iran. At the 2006 census, its population was 139, in 28 families.

References 

Populated places in Rudan County